Middle of Nowhere, Center of Everywhere is an album by stoner metal band Acid King. It was released in April 2015 through Svart Records. This album comes after a decade long hiatus related to personnel changes in the band.

Track listing
"Intro" – 3:53
"Silent Pictures" – 9:18
"Coming Down from Outer Space" – 5:47
"Laser Headlights" – 6:52
"Red River" – 8:26
"Infinite Skies" – 7:50
"Center of Everywhere" – 8:45
"Outro" – 2:37

Credits 
Lori S. – vocals, guitar
Mark Lamb – additional guitar
Rafa Martinez – Hammond B-3, additional guitar
Billy Anderson – engineering, mixing
Toshi Kasai – engineering
Justin Weis – mastering
Tim Lehi – cover artwork

References

Acid King albums
2015 albums